Vizvary or Vizváry or Vizvári is a surname. Notable people with the surname include:

Kristof Vizvary (born 1983), Austrian handball player
Matúš Vizváry (born 1989), Slovak ice hockey player
Sylvia Čápová-Vizváry (born 1947), Slovak pianist
György Vizvári, Hungarian water polo player